Poseidon's Arrow is a Dirk Pitt novel, the twenty-second of that series, co-written by Clive Cussler and his son Dirk Cussler. The hardcover edition was released November 6, 2012. Other editions were released on other dates.

Plot
This book is about a secret prototype attack submarine the United States is developing and the efforts of a ruthless multimillionaire who wants to seize it by any means and sell it for a hefty profit. This millionaire antagonist also is bent on monopolizing most of the world's rare earth mineral mining operations and sell these minerals for a huge profit. This novel has many subplots and is set in a variety settings throughout the world. These subplots involve many characters, as well.

Clive Cussler makes a habit of writing himself into cameo appearances in his books. In this one he makes a short appearance, working as a barge captain who gets roughed up by those working for this tale's antagonist.

Reception
Judy Gigstad wrote in September 2012 on the Book Reporter website, "Poseidon's Arrow is a must read for Dirk Pitt fans." In September 2012 a review on the Kirkus Reviews website said, "Ranging from Panama and Mexico to Idaho and Washington, D.C., this book is constantly on the move--one reason it avoids dull spots so well." An Associated Press review in November 2012 said, "It's no "Inca Gold," but it's one of the better ones in the series written with Dirk Cussler."

References

Dirk Pitt novels

2012 American novels
G. P. Putnam's Sons books
Novels by Clive Cussler
Collaborative novels